The Mayor of the South Dhaka  is the chief executive of the  Dhaka North City Corporation. The Mayor's office administers all city services, public property, most public agencies, and enforces all city and state laws within Dhaka city.

The Mayor's office is located in Nagar Bhaban; it has jurisdiction over all 75 wards of Dhaka South City.

List of officeholders 

Political parties

Elections

Election result 2020

Election result 2015

References

Government of Dhaka
 
Dhaka, South